Renmin Road Subdistrict or Renminlu Subdistrict may refer to these subdistricts in China:

Renmin Road Subdistrict, Anqing, Anhui
Renmin Road Subdistrict, Baiyin, Gansu
Renmin Road Subdistrict, Haikou, Hainan
Renmin Road Subdistrict, Handan, Hebei
Renmin Road Subdistrict, Pingdingshan, Henan
Renmin Road Subdistrict, Puyang, Henan
Renmin Road Subdistrict, Zhengzhou, Henan
Renmin Road Subdistrict, Chenzhou, Hunan
Renmin Road Subdistrict, Hohhot, Inner Mongolia
Renmin Road Subdistrict, Jiujiang, Jiangxi
Renmin Road Subdistrict, Dalian, Liaoning
Renmin Road Subdistrict, Shizuishan, Ningxia
Renmin Road Subdistrict, Xianyang, Shaanxi
Renmin Road Subdistrict, Wujiaqu, Xinjiang

See also
Renmin Street Subdistrict (disambiguation)
Renmin Subdistrict (disambiguation)